The Hawaii Air Depot Volunteer Corps (HADVC) was a civilian Paramilitary unit at Hickam Air Force Base, Hawaii during World War II. The HADVC took on a wide variety of roles helping in the routine operations of the airfield. Along with the Businessmen's Military Training Corps (BMTC), Hawaii Defense Volunteers, Women's Army Volunteer Corps (WAVC), 1st Oahu Volunteer Infantry, and 2nd Oahu Volunteer Infantry, they formed the Organized Defense Volunteer Regiments.  Surprisingly for a civilian militia, they had anti-aircraft guns in their arsenal.

History
The commanding officer of the HADVC was Lieutenant Colonel Cecil J Murphy. The unit was formed in October 1942 with a total of 1,500 personnel.

Tasks
Tasks and duties that the HADVC conducted included:
Anti-aircraft operations
firefighting
Conducting base security
Chemical decontamination
Providing EMS
Working as aircraft mechanics
Anti-sabotage work
Evacuation duties of non-combatants.

See also
Hawaii Territorial Guard

References

Military in Hawaii
Paramilitary organizations based in Hawaii
1942 establishments in Hawaii
1945 disestablishments in Hawaii